Cousin Phillis is a British television series which was originally broadcast on BBC One in 1982. It is an adaptation of the 1864 novel of the same title by Elizabeth Gaskell. A wedding scene was filmed on location at the Baptist Chapel, Great Warford.

Cast
 Anne-Louise Lambert as Phillis Holman
 Dominic Guard as Paul Manning
 Tim Woodward as Edward Holdsworth
 Ian Bannen as Reverend Ebenezer Holman
 Georgine Anderson as Margaret Holman
 Daphne Oxenford as Bessie Norton

References

Bibliography
Baskin, Ellen . Serials on British Television, 1950-1994. Scolar Press, 1996.

External links
 

BBC television dramas
1982 British television series debuts
1982 British television series endings
English-language television shows
Television shows based on British novels